German rearmament (Aufrüstung) was a policy and practice of rearmament carried out in Germany during the interwar period (1918–1939), in violation of the Treaty of Versailles which required German disarmament after WWI to prevent Germany from starting another war. It began on a small, secret, and informal basis shortly after the treaty was signed, but it was openly and massively expanded after the Nazi Party came to power in 1933.

Despite its scale, German re-armament remained a largely covert operation, carried out using front organizations such as glider clubs for training pilots and sporting clubs, and Nazi SA militia groups for teaching infantry combat techniques. Front companies like MEFO were set up to finance the rearmament by placing massive orders with Krupp, Siemens, Gutehofnungshütte, and Rheinmetall for weapons forbidden by the Treaty of Versailles.

Carl von Ossietzky exposed the reality of the German rearmament in 1931 and his disclosures won him the 1935 Nobel Peace Prize but he was imprisoned and tortured by the Nazis, dying of tuberculosis in 1938. Von Ossietzky's disclosures also triggered the re-armament policy in Great Britain, which escalated after Adolf Hitler withdrew Germany from the League of Nations and the World Disarmament Conference in 1933.

Despite notable warnings by von Ossietzky, Winston Churchill and others, successive governments across Europe failed to effectively recognize, cooperate, and respond to the potential danger posed by Germany's re-armament. Outside of Germany, a global disarmament movement was popular after World War I and Europe's democracies continued to elect governments that supported disarmament even as Germany pursued re-armament. By the late 1930s, the German military was easily capable of overwhelming its neighbors and the rapidly successful German conquests of Poland, Denmark, Norway, the Netherlands, Belgium, Luxembourg, and France proved just how poorly prepared Germany's neighbors were to defend themselves.

History

Weimar era
Germany's post-1918 rearmament began at the time of the Weimar Republic, when the Chancellor of Germany Hermann Müller, who belonged to the Social Democratic Party (SPD), passed cabinet laws that allowed secret and illegal rearmament efforts. During its early years (1918–1933), the rearmament was relatively small, secret, and supported by a cross-section of Germans motivated by a mixture of patriotism-based nationalism and economics-based nationalism.  The latter motive viewed the Treaty of Versailles, which was ostensibly about war reparations and peace enforcement. France wanted to make sure Germany would never again be a military threat. However, in the mid-1930s Britain and France would decline to fight another war to enforce the Versailles Treaty, thus bringing the treaty's effects to an end.

An example of the Weimar clandestine rearmament measures was the training and equipping of police forces in a way that made them not just paramilitary in organizational culture (which most police forces are, to one degree or another) but also well prepared to rapidly augment the military as military reserve forces, which the treaty did not allow. Another example was that the government tolerated that various Weimar paramilitary groups armed themselves to a dangerous degree. Their force grew enough to potentially threaten the state, but this was tolerated because the state hoped to use such militias as military reserve forces with which to rearm the Reichswehr in the future. Thus various Freikorps, Der Stahlhelm, the Reichsbanner, the Nazi SA, the Nazi SS, and the Ruhr Red Army grew from street gangs into private armies. For example, by 1931 Werner von Blomberg was using the SA in preparation for border defense in East Prussia.

Another aspect of Weimar era rearmament was massive investment in dual use technologies and fields of military technology which hadn't been mentioned in the Versailles treaty such as rocketry. Walter Dornberger was tasked with developing liquid fuel rockets for military purposes in 1930 and would become involved in the V2 rocket program later. The Deutsche Luft Hansa was never anywhere near profitability and aviation played only a minuscule role in the transportation of either passengers or cargo, but the planes it employed were very similar to then current military models and its existence allowed the growth of the domestic airplane building industry and the training of pilots, both of which could be converted to military use in circumvention of the prohibition of Germany maintaining an Air Force as lined out in the Versailles treaty.

One of the reasons why this militarization of society was difficult to prevent relates to the distinction between the government executive and the legislature.  The democratically elected government, being composed of groups of people, inevitably reflected the factional strife and cultural militarism among the populace. But the German Revolution of 1918–19 had not truly settled what the nature of the German state ought to be; Weimar Germany after its revolution was not very far from civil war—the different factions all hoped to transform the German state into the one that they thought it should be (which would require violent suppression of the other factions), and they expected their private armies to merge into the state's army (the Reichswehr) if they could manage to come to power. During the Republic's era of democracy, they all participated in the democratic definition of coming to power (winning votes), but many of them, on all sides, planned to abolish or diminish democracy in the future, if they could first get into position to do so.

During the Weimar era, there was extensive economic interaction between Germany and the Soviet Union, and a component of German re-armament was covertly holding military training exercises in the Soviet Union to hide their extent from other countries.  Germany–Soviet Union relations of the interwar period were complex, as bellicosity and cooperation coexisted in tortuous combinations.

Nazi government era: 1933-1945
After the Nazi takeover of power in January 1933, the Nazis pursued a greatly enlarged and more aggressive version of rearmament. During its struggle for power, the 'National Socialist party' (NSDAP) promised to recover Germany's lost national pride. It proposed military rearmament claiming that the Treaty of Versailles and the acquiescence of the Weimar Republic were an embarrassment for all Germans. The rearmament became the topmost priority of the German government. Hitler would then spearhead one of the greatest expansions of industrial production Germany had ever seen.

Third Reich Interior Minister Wilhelm Frick, one of the most influential Nazi figures of the time, and Hjalmar Schacht, who (while never a member of the NSDAP) was an initially sympathetic economist, introduced a wide variety of schemes in order to tackle the effects that the Great Depression had on Germany, were the main key players of German rearmament policies (see Reichsbank § Nazi period). 
Dummy companies like MEFO were set up to finance the rearmament; MEFO obtained the large amount of money needed for the effort through the Mefo bills, a certain series of Promissory notes issued by the Government of Nazi Germany.
Covert organizations like the Deutsche Verkehrsfliegerschule were established under a civilian guise in order to train pilots for the future Luftwaffe. Although available statistics do not include non-citizens or women, the massive Nazi re-armament policy almost led to full employment during the 1930s. The re-armament began a sudden change in fortune for many factories in Germany. Many industries were taken out of a deep crisis that had been induced by the Great Depression.

The creation of Mefo bills was the first fiscal step that Germany took on the road to rearmament.  The Versailles Treaty prohibited the German government from rearming. Therefore, to rearm to the capacity that Hitler was trying to attain, the Reichsbank would have to extend the German government an almost unlimited amount of credit towards the rearmament program while hiding the accumulation of Government debt from the international community.  Contrary to this goal, the then Reichsbank President Hans Luther would only extend credit of one-hundred million Reichsmarks to rearmament, so to work around this, Hitler replaced Luther with Hjalmar Schacht. Schacht turned Luther’s “employment creation bills” program into a system that would allow the German government to receive an unlimited amount of credit to put towards their program.  Schacht created the Metallurgische Forschungs-G.m.b.H, a shell company that would issue short-term treasury notes, which would “function as a concealed form of money.”  The company would sell over 12 billion Reichsmarks worth of Mefo-bills by 1938, money which would all go to fund rearmament. Since Schacht’s company did not function and instead just worked as a front for government-issued debt, this allowed the Nazi Regime to conceal their rearmament funding from the international community.  Without the creation of the Mefo program, the international community would have been immediately alarmed at the raising of funds by Nazi Germany, and the rearmament program would be threatened by external intervention.

In another instance of money market fraud, one can examine Schacht’s manipulation of the American international exchange system, which provided Germany an arbitrage opportunity allowing them to fund their rearmament program. After attaining the position of Reichsbank President in 1933, Schacht told the American Government that the German corporations, government, and municipalities would be unable to pay their interest payments to American bondholders on American denominated debt. The cancellation of interest payments was due to the lack of foreign exchange that Germany claimed they had in their treasury.  Although German exchange resources had been depleted during the great depression, the German government was not short enough on foreign exchange to completely stop paying bond coupon payments. Instead, the German government wanted to use the foreign exchange to pay for rearmament and fund its activities abroad, an example being the support of Konrad Henlein and the Sudeten German Party  In doing this, Schacht realized an arbitrage opportunity. In defaulting on their debt, the Germans would subsequently decrease the value of the debt on the American markets, where they could then go and repurchase the bonds with the “allegedly nonexistent foreign exchange at a fraction of their face value.”  The debt purchaser could then sell the bond back to the issuer and exchange it for the American dollar-denominated debt for Reichsmarks. The German government could then take the foreign exchange that they had received and pay for their rearmament program, an example being purchasing American plane parts with the US dollars they accumulated from this program.  Schacht took the program even further; he would allow German exporters to use a portion of their foreign exchange reserves to purchase the debt.  They would then turn around and sell the debt back to the debtors for Reichsmarks, subsidizing exports at the expense of the bondholder while allowing German debtors to repurchase their debt at a large discount. The American bondholder would risk the value of the bond dropping significantly, or they could resell to the German exporters.  Schacht’s plan allowed the Nazi Regime to make a foreign exchange that they could use for rearmament and support their propaganda efforts abroad.

By 1935, Hitler was open about rejecting the military restrictions set forth by the Treaty of Versailles. Rearmament was announced on 16 March, as was the reintroduction of conscription.

Some large industrial companies, which had until then specialized in certain traditional products began to diversify and introduce innovative ideas in their production pattern. Shipyards, for example, created branches that began to design and build aircraft. Thus, the German re-armament provided an opportunity for advanced, and sometimes revolutionary, technological improvements, especially in the field of aeronautics.

Work by labour historians has determined that many German workers in the 1930s identified passionately with the weapons they were building. While this was in part due to the high status of the skilled work required in the armaments industries, it was also to do with the weapons themselves - they were assertions of national strength, the common property of the German nation. Adam Tooze noted in 2008 that an instruction manual given to tank crews during the war made clear this connection:

For every shell you fire, your father has paid 100 Reichsmarks in taxes, your  mother has worked for a week in the factory ... The Tiger costs all told  800,000 Reichsmarks and 300,000 hours of labour. Thirty thousand people  had to give an entire week's wages, 6,000 people worked for a week so that you  can have a Tiger. Men of the Tiger, they all work for you. Think what you have in your hands!

The Spanish Civil War (1936–1939) would provide an ideal testing ground for the proficiency of the new weapons produced by the German factories during the re-armament years. Many aeronautical bombing techniques (i.e. dive bombing) were tested by the Condor Legion German expeditionary forces against the Republican Government on Spanish soil with the permission of Generalísimo Francisco Franco. Hitler insisted, however, that his long-term designs were peaceful, a strategy labelled as Blumenkrieg ("Flower War").

Re-armament in the 1930s saw the development of different theories of how to prepare the German economy for total war. The first amongst these was 'defence in depth' which was put forward by Georg Thomas. He suggested that the German economy needed to achieve Autarky (or self-sufficiency) and one of the main proponents behind this was I.G. Farben. Hitler never put his full support behind Autarky and aimed for the development of 'defence in breadth' which espoused the development of the armed forces in all areas and was not concerned with preparing the German war economy.

The re-armament program quickly increased the size of the German officer corps, and organizing the growing army would be their primary task until the beginning of World War II on September 1, 1939. Count Johann von Kielmansegg (1906–2006) later said that the very involved process of outfitting 36 divisions kept him and his colleagues from reflecting on larger issues.

In any event, Hitler could boast on 26 September 1938 in the Berlin Sportpalast that after giving orders to rearm the Wehrmacht he could "openly admit: we rearmed to an extent the like of which the world has not yet seen".

Toleration shown by other states 
Since World War II, both academics and laypeople have discussed the extent to which German re-armament was an open secret among national governments. The failure of Allied national governments to confront and intercede earlier in Germany is often discussed in the context of the appeasement policies of the 1930s. A central question is whether the Allies should have drawn "a line in the sand" earlier than September 1939, which might have resulted in a less devastating war and perhaps a prevention of the Holocaust. However, it is also possible that anything that caused Hitler not to overreach as soon and as far as he did would only have condemned Europe to a more slowly growing Nazi empire, leaving plenty of time for a Holocaust later, and a successful German nuclear weapons program, safely behind a Nazi version of an iron curtain. George F. Kennan stated: "Unquestionably, such a policy might have enforced a greater circumspection on the Nazi regime and caused it to proceed more slowly with the actualization of its timetable. From this standpoint, firmness at the time of the reoccupation of the Rhineland (7 March 1936) would probably have yielded even better results than firmness at the time of Munich".

American corporate involvement 
Some 150 American corporations took part in German re-armament, supplying German companies with everything from raw materials to technology and patent knowledge. This took place through a complex network of business interests, joint ventures, cooperation agreements, and cross-ownership between American and German corporations and their subsidiaries. Resources supplied to German companies (some of which were MEFO front companies established by the German state) by American corporations included: synthetic rubber production technology (DuPont and Standard Oil of New Jersey), communication equipment (ITT), computing and tabulation machines (IBM), aviation technology (which was used to develop the Junkers Ju 87 bomber), fuel (Standard Oil of New Jersey and Standard Oil of California), military vehicles (Ford and General Motors), funding (through investment, brokering services, and loans by banks like the Union Banking Corporation), collaboration agreements, production facilities and raw materials. DuPont owned stocks in IG Farben and Degussa AG, who controlled Degesch, the producer of Zyklon B.

This involvement was motivated not only by financial gain, but in some cases by ideology as well. Irénée du Pont, director and former president of DuPont, was a supporter of Nazi racial theory and a proponent of eugenics.

See also
Anglo-German Naval Agreement
MEFO
Deutsche Verkehrsfliegerschule
British re-armament
 West German rearmament

References

Further reading
 Corum, James S. The Luftwaffe: Creating the Operational Air War, 1918-1940 (1997)
 Muller, Richard R. "Hitler, Airpower, and Statecraft." in Robin Higham and Mark Parillo, eds., The Influence of Airpower Upon History: Statesmanship, Diplomacy, and Foreign Policy Since 1903 (2013): 85+.
 Overy, Richard J. War and Economy in the Third Reich (1995).
 Slepyan, Kenneth. "Mass Production and Mass Dictatorships: The Economics of Total War in Nazi Germany and the Soviet Union, 1933–1945." in Paul Corner and Jie-Hyun Lim, eds. The Palgrave Handbook of Mass Dictatorship (Palgrave Macmillan, London, 2016. 293-308.
 Tooze, Adam. The wages of destruction: The making and breaking of the Nazi economy'' (2008).

External links
NAZI Rearmament/Aufrüstung, Historical Boys' Clothing

Economy of Nazi Germany
Re-armament
Military equipment of Germany
Military history of Germany
Military of Nazi Germany
Military of the Weimar Republic
Technological races